Vukašin Dobrašinović (born 15 July 1964) is a Montenegrin boxer. He competed in the men's light welterweight event at the 1988 Summer Olympics.

References

1964 births
Living people
Light-welterweight boxers
Montenegrin male boxers
Yugoslav male boxers
Olympic boxers of Yugoslavia
Boxers at the 1988 Summer Olympics
People from Berane
Mediterranean Games medalists in boxing
AIBA World Boxing Championships medalists
Mediterranean Games gold medalists for Yugoslavia
Mediterranean Games bronze medalists for Yugoslavia
Competitors at the 1983 Mediterranean Games
Competitors at the 1987 Mediterranean Games